Rudolf Steglich (18 February 18868 July 1976) was a German musicologist, music editor and academic teacher, who was professor at the University of Erlangen from 1930 to 1956. His focus was life and music of George Frideric Handel. He was instrumental in the composer's revival from the 1920s, and was from 1955 co-editor of the Hallische Händel-Ausgabe, the critical edition of the composer's complete works.

Career 
Steglich was born in Rats-Damnitz, then in the Prussian Province of Pomerania, now in Poland. He studied in Dresden from 1900 to 1906 with Liszt pupil Bertrand Roth. He then studied musicology with Adolf Sandberger at the Ludwig-Maximilians-Universität München and with Johannes Wolf at the Humboldt University of Berlin. In 1911, he achieved the doctorate, supervised by Hugo Riemann, at the University of Leipzig with a dissertation Die quaestiones in musica: ein Choraltraktat des zentralen Mittelalters und ihr mutmasslicher Verfasser Rudolf von St. Trond (1070-1138) (The quaestiones in musica: A Choral Tract of the Central Middle Ages and its presumed author Rudolf of St Trond (1070-1138)).

Steglich served as a soldier in the First World War. He taught at the Hannover Conservatory from 1925.

Steglich achieved his habilitation in 1930 at the University of Erlangen with a thesis Die elementare Dynamik des musikalischen Rhythmus (The elementary dynamics of musical rhythm). He then succeeded Gustav Becking as Privatdozent for musicology, and was also chairman of the musicology seminar. In 1934, he became associate professor. From 1936 to 1940, he published the journal Archiv für Musikforschung. He was one of 26 musicologists who took part in the 1938 Reichsmusiktage in Düsseldorf, an event of Nazi propaganda. After World War II, Steglich taught in Erlangen until his retirement in 1956.

Steglich died in Scheinfeld near Nürnberg at the age of 90.

Focus on Handel, legacy 
While Steglich researched music of the 18th and early 19th century (Bach and his sons, Handel, Mozart, Beethoven and Schumann), the focus of his interest was George Frideric Handel. In the 1920s, he contributed to the Handel renaissance. From 1928 to 1933, he was editor of the Händel-Jahrbuch (Handel yearbook). In 1939, he published a monograph on Handel's life and work. He was then co-editor, with Max Schneider, of the Hallische Händel-Ausgabe, a new critical edition of the composer's complete works.

His contributions to the theory of rhythm and his reflections on musicology and music practice influenced further research. Many of his articles appeared in the Neue Zeitschrift für Musik (from 1922) and in Musica (from 1948).

Publications 
 Die Quaestiones in musica (dissertation, 1911)
 Die elementare Dynamik des musikalischen Rhythmus (habilitation thesis, 1930)
 Was weißt Du von Händel? (1931)
 Johann Sebastian Bach (1935)
 Mozarts Flügel klingt wieder (1937)
 Georg Friedrich Händel (1939)
 Robert Schumanns Kinderszenen (1949)
 Wege zu Bach (1949)
 Über die "kantable Art" der Musik Johann Sebastian Bachs (1957)
 Georg Friedrich Händel (1960)
 Tanzrhythmen in der Musik Johann Sebastian Bachs. (1962)

References

External links 

 
 
 Steglich, Rudolf Bayerisches Musiker Lexikon Online
 Johann Sebastian Bach Henle Verlag
 Review by Steglich of Johann Sebastian Bach, der Meister und sein Werk by Wilibald Gurlitt jstor.org
 Hallische Händel-Ausgabe SLUB
 Steglich, Rudolf (ed.) Bach, Carl Philipp Emanuel / Die sechs Preußischen Sonaten Wq 48 (in German) Bärenreiter

German music historians
20th-century German musicologists
German music critics
German music journalists
1886 births
1976 deaths
People from Pomerania